Stadion ETO was a multi-use stadium in Győr, Hungary. It was initially used as the stadium of Győri ETO FC matches.  It was replaced by ETO Park in 2008.  The capacity of the stadium was 25,000 spectators at its height, but was later reduced to 14,600 (UEFA capacity).

External links
 Stadium history
 ETO Stadium at magyarfutball.hu

Defunct football venues in Hungary
Győri ETO FC